Allocyttus is a genus of oreos.

Species
There are currently four recognized species in this genus:
 Allocyttus folletti G. S. Myers, 1960 (Oxeye oreo)
 Allocyttus guineensis Trunov & Kukuev, 1982 (Guinea oreo)
 Allocyttus niger G. D. James, Inada & I. Nakamura, 1988 (Black oreo)
 Allocyttus verrucosus (Gilchrist, 1906) (Warty dory)

References

Oreosomatidae
Ray-finned fish genera
Taxa named by Allan Riverstone McCulloch